"Stuck with Me" is a song by American rock band Green Day. It was released as the second single and third track from their fourth album, Insomniac. The song is about being too weak and too much of a push-over to stand up for yourself. The song also appears on the live album Foot in Mouth. It peaked at number 26 on the UK Singles Chart. Originally this song was titled "Alright" on demo and later "Do Da Da". The demo with the latter title would be later released on the band's B-side compilation Shenanigans.

Track listing

Promo
"Stuck with Me" (Radio edit) - 2:15

UK CD Part 1
"Stuck with Me" - 2:16
"When I Come Around" (live) - 2:54
"Jaded" (live) - 1:52

Recorded live September 4, 1995 at Vejlby Risskov Hallen, Aarhus, Denmark

UK CD Part 2
"Stuck with Me" (live)
"Dominated Love Slave" (live)
"Chump" (live)

 Live tracks recorded September 4, 1995 at Vejlby Risskov Hallen, Aarhus, Denmark

Music video
The music video depicts the band performing the song in black-and-white, intercut with animated sequences depicting art by Winston Smith that was done for Insomniac.

Chart positions

References

1995 singles
Green Day songs
Songs written by Billie Joe Armstrong
Song recordings produced by Rob Cavallo
1995 songs
Songs written by Tré Cool
Songs written by Mike Dirnt
Reprise Records singles